Qernertunnguit is a neighborhood of Nuuk, the capital of Greenland. It is part of the Quassussuup Tungaa district, located in the northwestern part of the town, facing the Nuup Kangerlua fjord.

Transport 
Nuup Bussii provides bus services linking the neighborhood to the Nuuk Centrum.

References

Districts and neighborhoods of Nuuk